The list of handheld game consoles documents notable handheld game consoles released as commercial products. Handheld game consoles are portable video game consoles with a built-in screen and game controls and the ability to play multiple and separate video games. It does not include PDAs, smartphones, or tablet computers; while those devices are often capable of playing games, they are not generally classified as video game consoles. This is not a complete list; it only lists handheld game consoles with its own Wikipedia article and a source verifying its classification as a handheld console.

List

Canceled
This is a list of notable canceled handheld game consoles.

See also
List of best-selling game consoles
List of video game console emulators
Comparison of handheld game consoles
List of video game consoles
List of home video game consoles
List of microconsoles
List of dedicated consoles
List of retro style video game consoles

References

 
Handheld game consoles